The Nokia N81 is a Symbian OS smartphone announced by Nokia on 29 August 2007 and released the next month. It runs S60 3rd Edition, Feature Pack 1.

The N81 was marketed as an entertainment device focused on music and gaming. It was the first device that came preloaded with the N-Gage 2.0 gaming service in 2008 (albeit in public beta), and it features two dedicated gaming keys that can be used for N-Gage games (this would later also appear on the N96, N85 and 5730 XpressMusic). During the launch of N-Gage 2.0, the N81 was specifically chosen by Nokia in advertisements. It was also much marketed as a music-centric smartphone and was one of the first to support the Nokia Music Store service. It has stereo speakers that are considered to be very loud. Several reviewers have claimed that the N81 has, much like the older Nokia N91, a very high sound output quality and therefore highly suitable for audiophiles.

The four-way silver-coloured D-pad below the display also contains a new capacitive sensor called the Navi wheel, which allows scrolling in the S60 gallery and music player applications by 'stroking' the key, in a similar manner to the iPod click wheel. It is a unique feature that rarely appears on mobile handsets. The Navi wheel would later also appear on other Nokia Nseries handsets: N78, N85 and N96.

Other than these the N81 has more modest specifications compared to the Nokia N95, with a 2-megapixel camera, lacking both GPS and HSDPA, and weighing 20 grams heavier. However the N81 did have an ARM11 369 MHz processor, the fastest on a Nokia device at the time. The Nokia N81 notably features a sliding spring-loaded physical keylock on the top of the device, located next to the 3.5 mm jack. It is the first Nseries device that swapped the miniUSB port in favour of microUSB.

A variant called N81 8GB with 8-gigabytes of internal flash memory was also announced at the same time. This version retailed for 430 euros before taxes, 70 euros more than the standard version which requires a microSD memory card to expand its 12 megabytes of storage. N81 would be succeeded by the N85.

Reception 
The Nokia N81 had a lower sound output compared to the N91 due to the release of the new firmware version. According to Nokia, they must follow an international standard wherein a device's initial or default volume must be set too low to cause any damage to its users.

CNET found it buggy, slow, and badly designed. S21 gave it 3/5, praising its feature set, while again criticising the "plasticky" design. However its musical capabilities have been highly praised.

References 

N-Gage (service) compatible devices
Nokia Nseries
Mobile phones introduced in 2007
Slider phones